The Tuchodi River is a stream in the Northern Rocky Mountains of northern British Columbia, Canada.
The river flows through the Northern Rocky Mountains Provincial Park in a northeasterly direction to the Muskwa River.
Its name comes from Slavey words that mean "place of large water", probably a reference to the two lakes where the river widens.

Course

The Kwadacha and Lloyd George glaciers drain the icefield to the east.
The icefield is bounded by the Warneford River and the Tuchodi River.
The headwaters of the Tuchodi feed the West and East Tuchodi lakes.  West Tuchodi Lake is formed where an alluvial fan caused by glacial action blocks the flow of the river. East Tuchodi Lake is formed where the river is blocked by sand and gravel debris at the mouth of Joplin Creek.  The small river continues after the lakes to the Muskwa River,
flowing fast through braided channels in a bed made of glacial rocks, gravel and sand. 
Tuchodi Peak named after the river.

Flora

Lower down, there are forests of lodgepole pine and white and black spruce. White spruce and aspen, and some balsam poplar, grow along the riverside, and there are willows and wildflowers on the sandy gravel bars of the river. 
Where the river leaves the Rockies and enters the eastern foothills, there has been large-scale burning to enhance wildlife range.  This has caused formation of young aspen stands and grasslands.  In this area the floodplain of the river is narrower, running between high sandstone and shale hills with steep sides through narrow gorges with many shallow rapids.

Wildlife

There is a healthy population of elk and moose in the foothills of the Rocky Mountains, where they find abundant food.
Higher up, there are stone sheep and goats.
The valley is home to grizzly bears, black bears and wolves throughout its length.

References
Citations

Sources

Rivers of British Columbia
Peace River Land District